A1689-zD1 is a galaxy in the Virgo constellation. It was a candidate for the most distant and therefore earliest-observed galaxy discovered , based on a photometric redshift.

If the redshift, z~7.6, is correct, it would explain why the galaxy's faint light reaches us at infrared wavelengths. It could only be observed with Hubble Space Telescope's Near Infrared Camera and Multi-Object Spectrometer (NICMOS) and the Spitzer Space Telescope's Infrared Array Camera exploiting the natural phenomenon of gravitational lensing: the galaxy cluster Abell 1689, which lies between Earth and A1689-zD1, at a distance of 2.2 billion light-years from us, functions as a natural "magnifying glass" for the light from the far more distant galaxy which lies directly behind it, at 700 million years after the Big Bang, as seen from Earth.

See also
 IOK-1
 UDFy-38135539
 List of the most distant astronomical objects

References 

Virgo (constellation)
Galaxies
Dwarf galaxies
Gravitational lensing
Astronomical objects discovered in 2008